Archbishop Aristarkh (secular name Andrey Yevdokimovich Stankevich, ; 9 July 1941 – 22 April 2012) was the Belarusian Orthodox bishop of Gomel and Zhlobin, Belarus.

References

Bishops of the Russian Orthodox Church
1941 births
2012 deaths